Borrow a Million is a 1934 British comedy film directed by Reginald Denham and starring Reginald Gardiner, Vera Bogetti and Wally Patch. It was made at Wembley Studios as a quota quickie by the British subsidiary of the Fox Film Company.

Cast
 Reginald Gardiner as Alastair Cartwright  
 Vera Bogetti as Adele Cartwright  
 Charles Cullum as Michael Trent  
 Wally Patch as Bodgers 
 Meriel Forbes as Eileen Dacres  
 Robert Rendel as Struthers  
 Roland Culver as Charles Nutford  
 Wilson Coleman as Blake  
 Gordon McLeod as Bowers

References

Bibliography
 Low, Rachael. Filmmaking in 1930s Britain. George Allen & Unwin, 1985.
 Wood, Linda. British Films, 1927-1939. British Film Institute, 1986.

External links

1934 films
British comedy films
1934 comedy films
Films directed by Reginald Denham
Films shot at Wembley Studios
Quota quickies
British black-and-white films
1930s English-language films
1930s British films